Ficolin-2, which was initially identified as L-ficolin, is a protein that in humans is encoded by the FCN2 gene.

The product of this gene belongs to the ficolin family of proteins. This family is characterized by the presence of a leader peptide, a short N-terminal segment, followed by a collagen-like region, and a C-terminal fibrinogen-like domain. This gene is predominantly expressed in the liver, and has been shown to have carbohydrate binding and opsonic activities. Alternatively spliced transcript variants encoding different isoforms have been identified.

References

Further reading

Ficolins